Arleux is a commune in the Nord département in northern France.

Geography
The river Sensée joins the Canal du Nord at Arleux.

Population

Heraldry

See also
Communes of the Nord department

References

Communes of Nord (French department)